The 11th Grand National Assembly of Turkey existed from 27 October 1957 to 27 May 1960.
There were 610 MPs in the parliament. While The Democrat Party (DP) won a vast majority, the opposition was represented by the Republican People's Party (CHP) with 173 seats, the  Republican Nation Party (CMP) and Liberty Party (HP) each with 4 seats and 2 Independents.

Main parliamentary milestones 
Some of the important events in the history of the parliament are the following:
1 November  1957– Celal Bayar was elected as the President of Turkey for the third time
25 November 1957 - Adnan Menderes of DP formed the 23rd government of Turkey
17 October 1958 - CMP merged with another party to form Republican Villagers Nation Party
24 November 1958 – HP dissolved itself (Partially merged to CHP) 
17 February 1959 –Adnan Menderes survived 1959 Turkish Airlines Gatwick crash. This event briefly introduced détente in domestic policy 
4 March 1959 – Parliament majority ratified London and Zurich Agreements. But CHP opposed it
7 November 1959 – Osman Bölükbaşı the leader of CMP was jailed 
15 April 1960 - Committee of Inquest a superpower committee composed of DP MPs was formed
27 May 1960 - 1960 Turkish coup d'état

References

1957 establishments in Turkey
1960 disestablishments in Turkey

Terms of the Grand National Assembly of Turkey
Republican People's Party (Turkey)
Democrat Party (Turkey, 1946–1961)
Republican Nation Party
Republican Villagers Nation Party
Liberty Party (Turkey)
Political history of Turkey